Ogilvie-Grant or Ogilvy-Grant are surnames. Notable people with the surname include:

Francis Ogilvy-Grant, 6th Earl of Seafield (1778–1853), Scottish nobleman and Member of Parliament
Francis William Ogilvy-Grant, 10th Earl of Seafield (1847–1888), Scottish peer
Ian Ogilvy-Grant, 8th Earl of Seafield (1851–1884), Scottish peer
James Ogilvy-Grant, 9th Earl of Seafield (1817–1888),  Scottish peer and Member of Parliament 
James Ogilvie-Grant, 11th Earl of Seafield (1876–1915), Scottish nobleman
John Ogilvy-Grant, 7th Earl of Seafield (1815–1881), Scottish nobleman
Trevor Ogilvie-Grant, 4th Baron Strathspey (1879–1948), Scottish peer 
William Robert Ogilvie-Grant (1863–1924), Scottish ornithologist

Compound surnames
Surnames of Scottish origin